Pereute leucodrosime, the red banded pereute,  is a butterfly of the family Pieridae.

Subspecies
Subspecies include:
Pereute leucodrosime caesarea (Ecuador)
Pereute leucodrosime leucodrosime (Colombia, Venezuela)
Pereute leucodrosime beryllina (Ecuador)
Pereute leucodrosime bellatrix (Peru)

Distribution
This species can be found in South America, including Ecuador, Colombia, Bolivia, Venezuela and Peru.

Habitat
These butterflies mainly inhabit valley floor, tree canopy and forest edge.

Description
Pereute leucodrosime has a wingspan of 62–70 mm. This butterfly is basically black, with two orange transversal band on the uppersides of the forewings and a blue  basal area on the uppersides of hindwings. The undersides of the hindwings are uniformly blackish, with some red spots close to the base.

Biology
Adults are active in the morning during sunny conditions.

References

External links
 Natural History Museum
 Butterflies of America

Pierini
Pieridae of South America
Butterflies described in 1850
Taxa named by Vincenz Kollar